Tibetan Bells is a 1972 album by Henry Wolff and Nancy Hennings.  It was the first recording to use Tibetan bells and singing bowls, and helped establish some of the fundamentals of new-age music.

Track listing
"Khumbu Ice-Fall"  performed by Wolff /  Hennings – 2:23
"Rainbow Light"  performed by Wolff /  Hennings – 1:22
"White Light"  performed by Wolff /  Hennings – 2:15
"From the Roof of the World You Can See..."  performed by Wolff / Hennings  – 1:18
"From the Roof of the World You Can See..."  performed by Wolff / Hennings  – 0:39
"From the Roof of the World You Can See..."  performed by Wolff / Hennings  – 2:36
"Wrathful Deity/Clear Light/A Choir of..."  performed by Wolff /  Hennings – 24:21

References

1971 albums
New-age albums